John Arrison (born 1950/1951) is an American politician. He currently serves as a Democratic member for the Windsor-2 district of the Vermont House of Representatives.

Life and career 
Arrison was born in Chester, Vermont and attended Chester High School. He also attended the University of Vermont, where he focused on electrical engineering.

Arrison owned the Watts Up Electric Inc company. He was an electrical contractor and master electrician. He was also a professor at Norwich University.

In 2021, Arrison was elected to represent the Windsor-2 district of the Vermont House of Representatives, succeeding Annmarie Christensen. He ran for the election and was in the ballot along with Stu Lindberg, an Independent.

References 

1950s births
Living people
People from Chester, Vermont
Democratic Party members of the Vermont House of Representatives
21st-century American politicians
University of Vermont alumni
American electricians
Norwich University faculty
Year of birth missing (living people)